Bayard may refer to:

People
Bayard (given name)
Bayard (surname)
Pierre Terrail, seigneur de Bayard (1473–1524) French knight

Places
Bayard, Delaware, an unincorporated community
Bayard (Jacksonville), Florida, a neighborhood
Bayard, Iowa, a city
Bayard, Kansas, an unincorporated community
Bayard, Nebraska, a city
Bayard, New Mexico, a city
Bayard, Ohio, an unincorporated community
Bayard, West Virginia, a town
Fort Bayard (Washington, D.C.), an American Civil War-era fortification protecting the capital
Fort-Bayard, French Indochina: now Tsamkong (Zhanjiang), a city in Kwangtung (Guangdong), China
Les Bayards, a municipality in Switzerland until 2009
Col Bayard, a mountain pass in the French Alps
Bayard Islands, off the coast of Graham Land, Antarctica
Bayard, Saskatchewan, Canada, a hamlet

Ships
French ship Bayard, a number of ships in the French Navy
Bayard (ship), a sailing ship built in 1864
MS Bayard, former name of MS Wind Perfection, a cruiseferry operated by Fred. Olsen while named Bayard

Other
 Bayard (legend), a magic bay horse in the legends derived from the chansons de geste
 Bayard, trade name used by arms manufacturer Anciens Etablissements Pieper
 Bayard 1908 pistol
 Bergmann–Bayard pistol
 Bayard Presse, French press group
 Château Bayard, a French castle
 Bayard Bridge, across the North Branch Potomac River, connecting West Virginia and Maryland
 Bayard School, Pittsburgh, Pennsylvania, on the National Register of Historic Places
 Bayard, the traditional weapon of the Paladins in the Netflix series Voltron Legendary Defender

See also
Clément-Bayard, French automobile manufacturer 1903–1922
Bayardo (horse), English thoroughbred race horse